The  Edmonton Eskimos season was the 62nd season for the team in the Canadian Football League and their 71st overall. This was the fourth season under head coach Jason Maas and the third season under general manager Brock Sunderland. The team finished with an 8–10 record and fourth in the West Division. Notably, the team had a 1–10 record against playoff-bound teams and their 3–7 divisional record included only wins against the BC Lions.

The Eskimos qualified for the playoffs, following a one-year absence, after their week 18 win against the BC Lions on October 12, 2019. The team played in the East Semi-Final, earning a crossover spot in the 2019 playoffs, defeating the Montreal Alouettes in the East Semi-Final, but lost to the Hamilton Tiger-Cats in the East Final.

Following the season, the Eskimos parted ways with head coach Jason Maas. In addition, the 2019 season was the last season where the Eskimos team name was used, with an announcement during the suspended 2020 season the Eskimos name would be discontinued.

Offseason

Foreign drafts
For the first time in its history, the CFL held drafts for foreign players from Mexico and Europe. Like all other CFL teams, the Eskimos held three non-tradeable selections in the 2019 CFL–LFA Draft, which took place on January 14, 2019. The 2019 European CFL Draft took place on April 11, 2019 where all teams held one non-tradeable pick.

CFL draft
The 2019 CFL Draft took place on May 2, 2019. The Eskimos traded their third-round pick to the Toronto Argonauts for Martese Jackson, but acquired an additional fifth-round pick after trading Shamawd Chambers to the Hamilton Tiger-Cats. Like other CFL teams, the Eskimos held 4 additional non-tradeable selections across the 2019 CFL–LFA Draft and 2019 European CFL Draft.

Preseason

Regular season

Season standings

Season schedule

Post-season

Schedule

Team

Roster

Coaching staff

References

External links
 

Edmonton Elks seasons
2019 Canadian Football League season by team
2019 in Alberta